Alvescot is a village and civil parish about  south of Carterton, Oxfordshire, England. The 2011 Census recorded the parish's population as 472.

Archaeology
A Neolithic stone hand axe was found at Alvescot. Petrological analysis in 1940 identified the stone as epidotised tuff from Stake Pass in the Lake District,  to the north. Stone axes from the same source have been found at Kencot, Abingdon, Sutton Courtenay and Minster Lovell.

Church and chapel

Church of England
The Church of England parish church of Saint Peter is cruciform. The font is Norman and 12th- or 13th-century. The north transept and blocked north doorway are early 13th-century. The hoodmould over the south doorway is either late 13th- or early 14th-century, and the south porch was added in the 14th century. In the 15th century the nave was rebuilt and the present Perpendicular Gothic south transept and west tower were built. In the 16th century the south wall of the south transept was rebuilt and the present piscina in the south transept was inserted. St Peter's was restored in 1872 under the direction of the architects William Slater and Richard Carpenter. It is a Grade II* listed building.

The west tower has a ring of six bells. Abraham II Rudhall of Gloucester cast the tenor, second and fifth bells in 1727. Robert and James Wells of Aldbourne, Wiltshire cast the fourth bell in 1796. George Mears of the Whitechapel Bell Foundry cast the third bell in 1859. The Whitechapel Bell Foundry also cast the treble bell in 1985.  St Peter's parish is now part of the Benefice of Shill Valley and Broadshire.

Baptist
Alvescot used to have a Baptist congregation. Its former chapel is now a private house. There was also a Methodist congregation, but its chapel was demolished in the 1990s.

Economic and social history
It provided Alvescot railway station just outside the village on the road to Black Bourton. The Great Western Railway took over the line in 1890 and British Railways closed it in 1962.

Amenities

Alvescot has a public house, the Plough Inn, and a Church of England infants' school.

References

Sources and further reading

External links

Alvescot Parish Council

Civil parishes in Oxfordshire
Villages in Oxfordshire
West Oxfordshire District